The Malta College of Arts, Science and Technology (MCAST) is a vocational education and training institution in Malta.

Established in 2001, MCAST offers 180 full-time and over 300 part-time vocational courses ranging from certificates to Doctoral degrees (MQF Level 1 to Level 8).

Institutes

The following institutes make up MCAST:

Institute of Applied Sciences
Institute for the Creative Arts
Institute of Engineering and Transport
Institute of Business Management and Commerce
Institute of Community Services
Institute of Information and Communication Technology
Gozo Campus
Pathway to Independent Living

International collaboration 
In 2021 MCAST landed a formal collaboration with the Oslo-based Kuben Upper Secondary School, and will receive a class students from the vocational programs of computer electronics and engineering. The Norwegian students will attend MCAST for a full schoolyear.

References

External links

Education in Malta
Paola, Malta
Universities and colleges in Malta
2001 establishments in Malta
Educational institutions established in 2001